The 36th Australian Film Institute Awards (generally known as the AFI Awards) were held in 1994. Presented by the Australian Film Institute (AFI), the awards celebrated the best in Australian feature film, television, documentary and short film productions of the year.

Feature film

Additional awards

Television

Non-feature film

See also
 List of Australian films of 1993
 List of Australian films of 1994

References

External links
 The Australian Film Institute | Australian Academy of Cinema and Television Arts official website

AACTA Awards ceremonies
AACTA Awards
1994 in Australian cinema